Deep run is a tributary of the Great Egg Harbor River in Atlantic County, New Jersey, in the United States.

References

Rivers of New Jersey
Rivers of Atlantic County, New Jersey
Tributaries of the Great Egg Harbor River
Wild and Scenic Rivers of the United States